Dacne bipustulata is a species of pleasing fungus beetles native to Europe.

References

Erotylidae
Beetles described in 1781
Beetles of Europe